The 2021 Notre Dame Fighting Irish baseball team represents the University of Notre Dame during the 2021 NCAA Division I baseball season. The Irish will play their home games at Frank Eck Stadium as a member of the Atlantic Coast Conference. They are led by head coach Link Jarrett, in his 2nd season at Notre Dame.

Previous season

The 2020 Notre Dame Fighting Irish baseball team notched a 11–2 (3–0) regular season record. The season prematurely ended on March 12, 2020 due to concerns over the COVID-19 pandemic.

2021 season
During the 2021 regular season, Notre Dame finished with a record of 30–11 (25–10 in conference play) and won the ACC Atlantic Division. Notre Dame was selected to host regionals for the first time since 2004. Michigan, UConn, and Central Michigan were all placed in the South Bend regional with Notre Dame. The Irish won the regional with a final record of 3–0. On June 5, the Irish beat UConn in their second-round regional game by a score of 26–3. It was the record for the most runs scored during a playoff game in program history. The Irish advanced to the Starkville Super Regional, where they lost to Mississippi State.

Niko Kavadas set a program single-season home run record with 21, breaking Frank Jacobs' 1991 total.

Personnel

Roster

Coaching staff

Game log 

! style="" | Regular season
|- valign="top"

|- align="center" bgcolor=#ffbbbb
| February 27 || at Wake Forest ||  || David F. Couch Ballpark • Winston-Salem, NC || 8–10 || Cole McNamee (1–0) ||  (0–1) || Camden Minacci (2) || 233 || 0–1 || 0–1
|- align="center" bgcolor=#bbffbb
| February 27 || at Wake Forest ||  || David F. Couch Ballpark • Winston-Salem, NC || 5–4 || Liam Simon (1–0) || Crawford Wade (0–1) || Aidan Tyrell (1) || 278 || 1–1 || 1–1
|- align="center" bgcolor=#bbffbb
| February 28 || at Wake Forest ||  || David F. Couch Ballpark • Winston-Salem, NC || 10–0 ||  (1–0) || Shane Smith (0–1) || Alex Rao (1) || 401 || 2–1 || 2–1
|-

|- align="center" bgcolor=#ffbbbb
| March 5 || at Clemson || || Doug Kingsmore Stadium • Clemson, SC || 7–13 || Davis Sharpe (2–0) ||  (0–1) ||  || 1,280 || 2–2 || 2–2
|- align="center" bgcolor=#bbffbb
|  March 6 || at Clemson || || Doug Kingsmore Stadium • Clemson, SC || 3–1 || John Michael Bertrand (1–0) || Ty Olenchuk (1–1) || Will Mercer (1) || 1,280 || 3–2 || 3–2
|- align="center" bgcolor=#bbffbb
| March 7 || at Clemson || || Doug Kingsmore Stadium • Clemson, SC || 3–2 || Liam Simon (2–0) || Mack Anglin (0–1) ||  (1) || 1,280 || 4–2 || 4–2
|- align="center" bgcolor=#bbffbb
| March 12 || at Virginia ||  || Davenport Field • Charlottesville, VA || 10–5 || Liam Simon (3–0) || Andrew Abbott (1–3) || Joe Sheridan (1) || 221 || 5–2 || 5–2
|- align="center" bgcolor=#bbffbb
| March 13 || at Virginia ||  || Davenport Field • Charlottesville, VA || 12–4 || John Michael Bertrand (2–0) || Paul Kosanovich (0–1) || || 354 || 6–2 || 6–2
|- align="center" bgcolor=#bbffbb
| March 14 || at Virginia ||  || Davenport Field • Charlottesville, VA || 8–3 || Aidan Tyrell (1–0) || Mike Vasil (3–1) || Tanner Kohlhepp (1) || 350 || 7–2 || 7–2
|- align="center" bgcolor=#bbffbb
| March 19 || Duke || No. 23 || Frank Eck Stadium • Notre Dame, IN || 6–4 (13) ||  (1–1) || Matt Dockman (0–1) || || 210 || 8–2 || 8–2
|- align="center" bgcolor=#bbffbb
| March 20 || Duke || No. 23 || Frank Eck Stadium • Notre Dame, IN || 6–2 || John Michael Bertrand (3–0) || Henry Williams (2–1) || || 275 || 9–2 || 9–2
|- align="center" bgcolor=#ffbbbb
| March 21 || Duke || No. 23 || Frank Eck Stadium • Notre Dame, IN || 0–2 || Jack Carey (1–0) || Aidan Tyrell (1–1) || Marcus Johnson (2) || 300 || 9–3 || 9–3
|- align="center" bgcolor=#bbffbb
| March 23 ||  || No. 21 || Frank Eck Stadium • Notre Dame, IN || 6–3 || Will Mercer (1–0) || Easton Rhodehouse (1–1) || Liam Simon (1) || 75 || 10–3 || 
|- align="center" bgcolor=#ffbbbb
| March 26 || No. 7 Louisville || No. 21 || Frank Eck Stadium • Notre Dame, IN || 4–7 || Adam Elliott (3–1) || Joe Sheridan (0–1) || Kaleb Corbett (4) || 301 || 10–4 || 9–4
|- align="center" bgcolor=#bbffbb
| March 27 || No. 7 Louisville || No. 21 || Frank Eck Stadium • Notre Dame, IN || 5–3 || Jack Brannigan (1–0) || Tate Kuehner (1–3) || || 315 || 11–4 || 10–4
|-

|- align="center" bgcolor=#bbffbb
| April 3 || at Pittsburgh || No. 17 || Charles L. Cost Field • Pittsburgh, PA || 4–1 ||  (2–1) || Mitch Myers (2–4) || Joe Sheridan (2) || 55 || 12–4 || 11–4
|- align="center" bgcolor=#ffbbbb
| April 4 || at Pittsburgh || No. 17 || Charles L. Cost Field • Pittsburgh, PA || 2–3 || Jordan McCrum (2–1) || Liam Simon (3–1) ||  || 210 || 12–5 || 11–5
|- align="center" bgcolor=#bbffbb
| April 5 || at Pittsburgh || No. 19 || Charles L. Cost Field • Pittsburgh, PA || 11–5 || Tanner Kohlhepp (3–1) || Stephen Hansen (1–1) || || 210 || 13–5 || 12–5
|- align="center" bgcolor=#bbffbb
| April 9 || No. 22 Georgia Tech || No. 19 || Frank Eck Stadium • Notre Dame, IN || 10–9 || Joe Sheridan (1–1) || Zach Maxwell (0–1) || || 309 || 14–5 || 13–5
|- align="center" bgcolor=#bbffbb
| April 10 || No. 22 Georgia Tech || No. 19 || Frank Eck Stadium • Notre Dame, IN || 7–0 || Aidan Tyrell (2–1) || Andy Archer (4–3) || Alex Rao (2) || 152 || 15–5 || 14–5
|- align="center" bgcolor=#ffbbbb
| April 11 || No. 22 Georgia Tech || No. 19 || Frank Eck Stadium • Notre Dame, IN || 2–4 || Josiah Siegel (1–0) || Joe Sheridan (1–2) || Luke Bartnicki (4) || 125 || 15–6 || 14–6
|- align="center" bgcolor=#bbffbb
| April 13 ||  || No. 16 || Frank Eck Stadium • Notre Dame, IN || 8–4 || Alex Rao (1–0) || J.T. Rogoszewski (1–2) || || 116 || 16–6 ||
|- align="center" bgcolor=#bbffbb
| April 16 || NC State || No. 16 || Frank Eck Stadium • Notre Dame, IN || 3–2 || Tanner Kohlhepp (4–1) || Reid Johnston (3–2) || || 279 || 17–6 || 15–6
|- align="center" bgcolor=#ffbbbb
| April 17 || NC State || No. 16 || Frank Eck Stadium • Notre Dame, IN || 2–5 || Sam Highfill (3–2) ||  (3–1) || Evan Justice (2) || 237 || 17–7 || 15–7
|- align="center" bgcolor=#bbffbb
| April 18 || NC State || No. 16 || Frank Eck Stadium • Notre Dame, IN || 11–2 || Tanner Kohlhepp (5–1) || Matt Willadsen (3–1) ||  (3) || 188 || 18–7 || 16–7
|- align="center" bgcolor=#ffbbbb
| April 23 || at Boston College || No. 14 || Pellagrini Diamond • Chestnut Hill, MA || 0–10 || Emmett Sheehan (4–3) || Will Mercer (1–1) || || 150 || 18–8 || 16–8
|- align="center" bgcolor=#bbffbb
| April 24 || at Boston College || No. 14 || Pellagrini Diamond • Chestnut Hill, MA || 5–2 || John Michael Bertrand (4–1) || Mason Pelio (3–5) || Tanner Kohlhepp (2) || 150 || 19–8 || 17–8
|- align="center" bgcolor=#bbffbb
| April 24 || at Boston College || No. 14 || Pellagrini Diamond • Chestnut Hill, MA || 13–9 || Liam Simon (4–1) || Charlie Coon (1–2) || || 150 || 20–8 || 18–8
|- align="center" bgcolor=#bbffbb
| April 27 || Valparaiso || No. 14 || Frank Eck Stadium • Notre Dame, IN || 8–7 || Liam Simon (5–1) || Nathan Chasey (0–2) || || 97 || 21–8 || 
|- align="center" bgcolor=#bbffbb
| April 30 || North Carolina || No. 14 || Frank Eck Stadium • Notre Dame, IN || 4–0 || Tanner Kohlhepp (6–1) || Austin Love (5–4) || || 175 || 22–8 || 19–8
|-

|- align="center" bgcolor=#bbffbb
| May 1 || North Carolina || No. 14 || Frank Eck Stadium • Notre Dame, IN || 13–12 || John Michael Bertrand (5–1) || Shawn Rapp (1–1) || Aidan Tyrell (2) || 274 || 23–8 || 20–8
|- align="center" bgcolor=#bbffbb
| May 2 || North Carolina || No. 14 || Frank Eck Stadium • Notre Dame, IN || 19–5 ||  (7–1) || Gage Gillian (1–1) || || 275 || 24–8 || 21–8
|- align="center" bgcolor=#ffbbbb
| May 7 || Florida State || No. 10 || Frank Eck Stadium • Notre Dame, IN || 2–5 || Parker Messick (6–2) || Will Mercer (1–2) || Jack Anderson (3) || 358 || 24–9 || 21–9
|- align="center" bgcolor=#bbffbb
| May 8 || Florida State || No. 10 || Frank Eck Stadium • Notre Dame, IN || 5–3 || John Michael Bertrand (6–1) || Bryce Hubbart (5–4) || Jack Brannigan (2) || 302 || 25–9 || 22–9
|- align="center" bgcolor=#ffbbbb
| May 8 || Florida State || No. 10 || Frank Eck Stadium • Notre Dame, IN || 1–7 || Conor Grady (5–2) || Alex Rao (1–1) || || 302 || 25–10 || 22–10
|- align="center" bgcolor=#bbffbb
| May 11 || at Valparaiso || No. 15 || Emory G. Bauer Field • Valparaiso, IN || 7–4 || Will Mercer (2–2) ||  (3–3) || || 70 || 26–10 || 
|- align="center" bgcolor=#bbffbb
| May 20 || at Virginia Tech || No. 13 || English Field • Blacksburg, VA || 8–2 || John Michael Bertrand (7–1) || Peyton Alford (2–5) || || 448 || 27–10 || 23–10
|- align="center" bgcolor=#bbffbb
| May 21 || at Virginia Tech || No. 13 || English Field • Blacksburg, VA || 4–0 || Aidan Tyrell (3–1) || Anthony Simonelli (5–2) ||  (3) || 664 || 28–10 || 24–10
|- align="center" bgcolor=#bbffbb
| May 22 || at Virginia Tech || No. 13 || English Field • Blacksburg, VA || 7–1 || Alex Rao (2–1) || Ryan Okuda (2–3) || Will Mercer (2) || 619 || 29–10 || 25–10
|-

|-
! style="" | Postseason
|-

|- align="center" bgcolor=#bbffbb
| May 26 || vs. Virginia Tech || No. 7 || Truist Field • Charlotte, NC || 8–0 || Will Mercer (3–2) ||  || || 3,020 || 30–10 || 1–0
|- align="center" bgcolor=#ffbbbb
| May 28 || vs. Virginia || No. 7 || Truist Field • Charlotte, NC || 1–14 || Andrew Abbott (8–5) || John Michael Bertrand (7–2) || || || 30–11 || 1–1
|-

|- align="center" bgcolor=#bbffbb
| June 4 || vs. No. 26 Central Michigan || No. 7 || Frank Eck Stadium • Notre Dame, IN || 10–0 || John Michael Bertrand (8–2) || Andrew Taylor (11–4) || || 1,825 || 31–11 || 1–0
|-

|All rankings from Collegiate Baseball.

South Bend Regional

Starkville Super Regional

References 

Notre Dame
Notre Dame Fighting Irish baseball seasons
Notre Dame
Notre Dame Fighting Irish baseball